Tajal Chan Ahk was an 8th-century ruler of the Maya city Cancuén, whose rule lasted from 757 to c. 799.

He built the city's palace in 770.

References

 
 
 
 
 

8th-century deaths
Kings of Cancuén
Year of birth unknown
8th century in Guatemala